In probability theory and theoretical computer science, McDiarmid's inequality is a concentration inequality which bounds the deviation between the sampled value and the expected value of certain functions when they are evaluated on independent random variables. McDiarmid's inequality applies to functions that satisfy a bounded differences property, meaning that replacing a single argument to the function while leaving all other arguments unchanged cannot cause too large of a change in the value of the function.

Statement
More formally, if there are constants  such that for all , and all ,

Extensions

Unbalanced distributions

A stronger bound may be given when the arguments to the function are sampled from unbalanced distributions, such that resampling a single argument rarely causes a large change to the function value.

This may be used to characterize, for example, the value of a function on graphs when evaluated on sparse random graphs and hypergraphs, since in a sparse random graph, it is much more likely for any particular edge to be missing than to be present.

Differences bounded with high probability

McDiarmid's inequality may be extended to the case where the function being analyzed does not strictly satisfy the bounded differences property, but large differences remain very rare.

There exist stronger refinements to this analysis in some distribution-dependent scenarios, such as those that arise in learning theory.

Sub-Gaussian and sub-exponential norms

Let the th centered conditional version of a function  be
 

Bennett and Bernstein forms

Refinements to McDiarmid's inequality in the style of Bennett's inequality and Bernstein inequalities are made possible by defining a variance term for each function argument. Let

Proof

The following proof of McDiarmid's inequality constructs the Doob martingale tracking the conditional expected value of the function as more and more of its arguments are sampled and conditioned on, and then applies a martingale concentration inequality (Azuma's inequality).
An alternate argument avoiding the use of martingales also exists, taking advantage of the independence of the function arguments to provide a Chernoff-bound-like argument.

For better readability, we will introduce a notational shorthand:  will denote  for any  and integers , so that, for example,
 

Pick any . Then, for any , by triangle inequality,

and thus  is bounded.

Since  is bounded, define the Doob martingale  (each  being a random variable depending on the random values of ) as
 

Now define the random variables for each 
 
Since  are independent of each other, conditioning on  does not affect the probabilities of the other variables, so these are equal to the expressions
 

Note that . In addition,

See also

References

Probabilistic inequalities
Statistical inequalities
Martingale theory